The 1973 LPGA Championship was the 19th LPGA Championship, held June 7–10 at Pleasant Valley Country Club in Sutton, Massachusetts, southeast of Worcester.

Mary Mills, the 1964 champion, won her second LPGA Championship, a stroke ahead of runner-up Betty Burfeindt. She entered the final round one stroke behind the three co-leaders; and carded a three-under 70 to gain her third and final major title.

Past champions in the field

Source:

Final leaderboard
Sunday, June 10, 1973

Source:

References

External links
Golf Observer leaderboard

LPGA Championship
LPGA Championship
LPGA Championship
Golf in Massachusetts
History of Worcester County, Massachusetts
LPGA Championship
Sports competitions in Massachusetts
Sports in Worcester County, Massachusetts
Sutton, Massachusetts
Tourist attractions in Worcester County, Massachusetts
Women's PGA Championship
Women's sports in Massachusetts